John W. Donaldson was a Scottish amateur footballer who played as a right half in the Scottish League for Queen's Park.

Personal life 
Donaldson served as a sergeant and then as a second lieutenant in the Scottish Horse during the First World War.

Career statistics

References

Scottish footballers
Scottish Football League players
British Army personnel of World War I
Scottish Horse officers
Association football wing halves
Queen's Park F.C. players
Date of death missing
Year of birth missing